Metal Max 2 is the second entry in the Metal Max series. It was a vehicle combat RPG published in Japan by Data East in 1993 for the Super Famicom in 1993. Ten years later in 2003, the game was ported to the Game Boy Advance with a few new bounties by Now Production under the title Metal Max 2 Kai. In December 8, 2011, a full remake with upgraded graphics in the vein of Metal Max 3 and using its game engine was released in Japan for the Nintendo DS and titled Metal Max 2 Reloaded.

Gameplay 
Much of the gameplay is similar to its predecessor, Metal Max. The game is open-ended and non-linear, with the player given the freedom to decide where to go and what missions to do in whichever order. The player can choose the character classes, such as a mechanic or soldier, for the player characters. The battles are turn-based, with the characters able to fight either on foot or using tanks. The tanks can be created and customized by the player, who can modify and enhance each part of a vehicle, though there is a weight limit to each tank. In certain areas where tanks cannot pass, the characters must engage the enemies on foot. The game also features gambling machines where minigames can be played, including third-person shooter and racing games.

Synopsis 
The Grappler Army led by Ted Broiler has attacked the village of Modo, the protagonist who is the one of survivors embarks on a journey to destroy Grapplers.

Release 
Metal Max 2 Reloaded, the Nintendo DS remake, added a shared inventory, option to play as a female, okama or reijin, new character classes, subclasses and skills from Metal Max 3, new characters, bounties, bosses, sidequests, locations, items and vehicles, expanded storyline and backstories of characters and monsters, increased difficulty over the SNES and GBA versions, the final boss of the game has a third form and a New Game+ option has been added. An English fan translation of Metal Max 2 Reloaded is finished.

References

External links 

 
 
 

Role-playing video games
Metal Max
Data East video games
Kadokawa Shoten games
Now Production games
Super Nintendo Entertainment System games
Game Boy Advance games
Virtual Console games
Nintendo DS games
Video game sequels
Japan-exclusive video games
1993 video games
Video games developed in Japan
Video games scored by Satoshi Kadokura